Philipp Kircher is an economist, and Irving M. Ives Professor of Industrial and Labor Relations, at Cornell University.

He graduated from University of Bonn. He worked at University of Pennsylvania, Oxford University, the London School of Economics, the University of Edinburgh, and the European University Institute.

He is professorial fellow at University of Edinburgh.

Works

References

External links 

 Official website

Living people
Cornell University faculty
21st-century German economists
Year of birth missing (living people)
Academics of the University of Edinburgh